The 1989–90 Ranji Trophy was the 56th season of the Ranji Trophy. Bengal won a rain interrupted final against Delhi on run quotient.

Group stage

North Zone

Central Zone

East Zone

South Zone

West Zone

Knockout stage 
{{Round16

| seed-width  = 25px
| team-width  = 150px
| score-width = 100px

|||||
|||||
|||||
|8 Feb 1990 — Bombay|Bombay|636|Madhya Pradesh|394 & 199
|||||
|||||
|||||
|8 Feb 1990 — Jamshedpur|Bihar (F)''|567|Karnataka|274 & 170/4

|16 Feb 1990 — Secunderabad|Hyderabad (F)|416 & 234|Punjab|203 & 177/3
|16 Feb 1990 — Calcutta|Bengal (Q)|312/2|Bombay|590/5d
|16 Feb 1990 — Baroda|Baroda|320 & 275/7|Uttar Pradesh|405 & 189
|16 Feb 1990 — Delhi|Delhi (F)|264/8|Bihar|249

|2 Mar 1990 — Secunderabad|Hyderabad|417|Bengal (F)|539/8d & 81/1|2 Mar 1990 — Baroda|Baroda|234 & 225/4|Delhi (F)|560|23 Mar 1990 — Calcutta|Bengal (Q)|216/4|Delhi|278

|skipmatch01=yes|skipmatch02=yes|skipmatch03=yes|skipmatch04=no|skipmatch05=yes|skipmatch06=yes|skipmatch07=yes|skipmatch08=no
|RD1 = Pre-Quarter-finals|RD2 = Quarter-finals|RD3 = Semi-finals|RD4 = Finals
|3rdplace=no}}(F) - Advanced to next round on First Innings Lead.(Q)''' - Advanced to next round/won the final on better Quotient.

Final

Scorecards and averages
Cricketarchive

References

External links

Ranji Trophy
Ranji Trophy
Ranji Trophy seasons